Casa Alonso is a house museum and cultural center in Vega Baja Pueblo, the historic downtown of the municipality of Vega Baja, Puerto Rico.  It was listed on the National Register of Historic Places in 1996.  The house is also known as Museo de Arte, Historia y Cultura Casa Alonso, administered by the municipality of Vega Baja.

It is a two-story wood and masonry "neoclassical vernacular style" residence. It was lived in successively by Soliveras, Otero, and Alonso families, of sugar plantation wealth.

Gallery

References

External links 
 
 Museum information
 Article about the museum

Art museums and galleries in Puerto Rico
Museums in Vega Baja, Puerto Rico
Alonso
Spanish Colonial architecture in Puerto Rico
Historic house museums in Puerto Rico
Cultural centers